Shahdun Nisha, an Indian politician. She was elected to the Bihar Legislative Assembly from Ramgarh in a 1973 by-poll, as a Communist Party of India (CPI) candidate. She obtained 28,994 votes in the by-poll. Shahdun Nisha was the widow of CPI leader Manjur Hassan Khan, who had won the Ramgarh seat in the 1972 election but died in 1973.

References

Communist Party of India politicians from Bihar
Year of birth missing (living people)
Bihar MLAs 1972–1977
20th-century Indian women politicians
20th-century Indian politicians
Living people
Women members of the Bihar Legislative Assembly